Sheberghan Airfield  is located in the Jowzjan Province in the northwest part of Afghanistan.

Facilities

The downward sloping runway is gravel base with a small cement run-up pad at the south end. The runway is slightly damaged. There aren't any facilities.

See also
List of airports in Afghanistan

References

External links
 
 Airport record for Sheberghan Airfield at Landings.com.

Airports in Afghanistan
Jowzjan Province